Alasdair White is a Scottish folk musician born in 1983 on the Isle of Lewis, Outer Hebrides, Scotland. In 2001, when he was only 18 years old, he joined Battlefield Band as a virtuoso fiddle player.

Origins
White is a Scottish Gaelic speaker, and originates from Tong on the Isle of Lewis one of Scotland's Outer Hebrides islands, a geographical area where the Gaelic language and culture are of great importance to its native inhabitants; it is this, combined with general Scottish culture that influences White's playing style.

White's chief instrument is the fiddle, which he generally plays in West-Highland and North-West styles; these styles being heavily derived from a culture with a rich piping tradition. He also plays the whistle, banjo, bouzouki, mandolin, Highland and Small pipes, 'and probably anything else he can lay his hands on!'

Early career
White's musical career started while still at school playing with the Face the West, releasing their first CD, Edge of Reason, while still at school. The band continued on when White left to join Battlefield Band and have just released their second album. White will be appearing with Face the West at the Hebridean Celtic Festival in July 2009 for a Face the West and Friends gig on the main stage.

Battlefield Band
White joined Battlefield Band in September 2001 and appeared for the first time on a Battlefield Band album on Time and Tide (2002). Since then, he appeared on all Battlefield Band subsequent (studio) albums: Out for the Night (2004), The Road of Tears (2006), Dookin (2007), Zama Zama... Try Your Luck  (2009), Line-up (2011), Room Enough For All (2013) and their latest album to date Beg & Borrow (2015).

Solo career
Aside from Battlefield Band, White released a solo album in 2006 entitled An Clár Geal (The White Album). This album features thirteen tracks, traditional Scottish arrangements as well as White's own work. On this album, White worked with musicians Ewen McPherson (Banjo/Guitar/Mandolin/Tromb), Aaron Jones (10-string bouzouki/Bass), Iain Copeland (Percussion), Russel Hunter (Piano), Alison Kinnaird (Scottish Harp) and fellow Battlefield Band member Mike Katz (Highland Pipes/Scottish Small Pipes in keys C and A). In early 2008, An Clàr Geal won in The 7th Annual Independent Music Awards for Best Traditional World Album.

White is currently touring the US with the talented Scottish group Dàimh, temporarily replacing their regular fiddler, Gabe McVarish who has started a micro-brewery in Scotland and cannot currently tour outside the country.

Discography
FTW001   Face the West - Edge of Reason
COMD2086 Christine Primrose - Gun Sireadh, Gun Iarraidh
COMD2089 Pat Kilbride - Nightingale Lane
COMD2093 Various Artists - The Portraits and the Music
COMD2090 Battlefield Band - Time & Tide
COMD2094 Battlefield Band - Out For The Night
COMD2095 Mike Katz - A Month of Sundays
COMD2096 Alison Kinnaird - The Silver String
COMD2098 Battlefield Band - The Road of Tears
COMD2099 Alasdair White - An Clàr Geal
COMD2100 Battlefield Band - Dookin'''
COMD2101 Mike Whellans Fired-Up & ReadyFTW002 Face The West - The Wishing Stone [CD]
Niall Kirkpatrick Ceilidh Band - The Iona Connection (2005)
Niall Kirkpatrick Ceilidh Band - West Coast Swing'' (2007)
WSFTW003 Face The West - "The Young Fear Nothing" (2012)

References

External links

1983 births
Living people
People from the Isle of Lewis
Scottish fiddlers
British male violinists
Scottish folk musicians
Independent Music Awards winners
Scottish Gaelic singers
Battlefield Band members
21st-century violinists
21st-century British male musicians